Chen Yeong-kang is an Admiral of the Republic of China (Taiwan). He was the 5th Commander of the Republic of China Navy (ROCN) from 1 August 2013 until 30 January 2015. On 17 March 2015, in an interview with Proceedings magazine of the United States Naval Institute, he stated that the ROCN had a "3A plan," meaning "affordable, applicable and accountable."

See also
 Executive Yuan

References

1951 births
Living people
Republic of China Navy admirals
Taiwanese Ministers of National Defense